CINQ-FM is a multilingual Canadian radio station located in Montreal, Quebec.

It broadcasts on 102.3 MHz using a directional antenna with an average effective radiated power of 1,285 watts and a peak effective radiated power of 2,335 watts (class A). Its studios are located on Saint-Laurent Boulevard in Montreal.

The station operates under a community radio licence and offers varied programming in seven different languages whereas all programmes are produced and animated by volunteers. It identifies itself as "Radio Centre-Ville".

CINQ-FM opened on 27 January 1975; at the time the station was on 99.3 MHz and used only 7.5 watts of power. Originally, the station aired programming in five different languages, hence the call sign ("cinq" being the French word for "five"). Those five languages were English, French, Spanish, Portuguese, and Greek. It has since added Arabic and Haitian Creole programming to its lineup.

External links
 Official website
 

 CINQ-FM's Chinese team blog

INQ
INQ
INQ
Radio stations established in 1975
1975 establishments in Quebec